The Kaohsiung Exhibition Center (KEC) is a convention center in Cianjhen District, Kaohsiung, Taiwan.

History
Designed by Australian architect, Philip Cox, the KEC was initiated in 2006 and built by the Ministry of Economic Affairs in which has invested NT$ 3 billion to the venue. After seven years of planning and two years of construction, the grand opening of the center was held on 14 April 2014.

Organization
The Kaohsiung Exhibition Center Corporation manages the daily operation and maintenance of the center for the next 12.5 years. The company invested NT$ 250 million to upgrade the center and expects to generate return on investment of up to NT$ 3.4 billion by the end of 2026.

Gallery

Transportation
The center is accessible within walking distance south west from Sanduo Shopping District Station of Kaohsiung MRT.

The center can also be accessible by walking south of the Kaohsiung Exhibition Center light rail station.

See also
 List of tourist attractions in Taiwan

References

External links

 

2014 establishments in Taiwan
Convention centers in Kaohsiung
Event venues established in 2014
Philip Cox buildings